Gertrud Ström was a Swedish figure skater who competed in pair skating. With partner Richard Johansson, she won the bronze medal at the 1909 World Figure Skating Championships.

Competitive highlights 
With  Richard Johansson

References 

Swedish female pair skaters
Date of birth missing
Date of death missing